Stryme was an ancient Greek city on the south coast of ancient Thrace, a little to the west of Mesembria, between which and Stryme flowed the small river Lissus, which the army of Xerxes I is said to have drunk dry. It was founded by colonists from Thasos; but disputes seem to have arisen respecting it between the Thasii and the people of the neighbouring city of Maroneia. In some sources, Stryme is called a Thasian polis bordering on Mesambria, but the account Herodotos provides is contradictory. Stryme was located in the Briantike, a region belonging to the Thracian Kikones.

This site is currently being investigated by a synergasia between the American School of Classical Studies at Athens, represented by Princeton University, and the 19th Ephorate of Prehistoric and Classical Antiquities (Komotini).

See also
Greek colonies in Thrace

References

Populated places in ancient Thrace
Former populated places in Greece
Thasian colonies
Ionian colonies in Thrace